*Isaz  is the reconstructed Proto-Germanic name of the i-rune , meaning "ice". In the Younger Futhark, it is called íss in Old Norse. As a rune of the Anglo-Saxon futhorc, it is called is.

The corresponding Gothic letter is 𐌹 i, named eis.

The rune is recorded in all three rune poems:

See also
Elder Futhark
Younger Futhark
Rune poem

References 

Runes